Anne Michaels (born 15 April 1958) is a Canadian poet and novelist whose work has been translated and published in over 45 countries. Her books have garnered dozens of international awards including the Orange Prize, the Guardian Fiction Prize, the Lannan Award for Fiction and the Commonwealth Poetry Prize for the Americas. She is the recipient of honorary degrees, the Guggenheim Fellowship and many other honours. She has been shortlisted for the Governor General's Award, the Griffin Poetry Prize, twice shortlisted for the Giller Prize and twice long-listed for the International Dublin Literary Award. Michaels won a 2019 Vine Award for Infinite Gradation, her first volume of non-fiction. Michaels was the poet laureate of Toronto, Ontario, Canada from 2016 to 2019, and she is perhaps best known for her novel Fugitive Pieces which was adapted for the screen in 2007.

Early life
Anne Michaels was born in Toronto, Ontario, in 1958. Michaels attended Vaughan Road Academy and then later the University of Toronto, where she is an adjunct faculty member in the Department of English.

Career
With her first two poetry collections, The Weight of Oranges and Miner's Pond, Michaels gained attention as a writer who balances technical precision with profound meditation and humanity. The recipient of the Commonwealth Poetry Prize for the Americas and the Canadian Authors' Association Award, and a finalist for both the Governor General's Award and the Trillium Award, Michaels secured her place among the finest Canadian poets early in her career.

Following her early success with poetry, Michaels found herself "bumping up more frequently against its limits. [She] was pushing the form as far as [she] could in longer pieces, trying to make connections on a larger scale. [She] stretched poetry as far as it would go in terms of length." Her debut novel, Fugitive Pieces (1996), offered Michaels the opportunity to work more expansively with complicated questions related to history, identity, location, and grief:  "a way of layering things; of having images and gestures that connect between page 100 and page 303. It [gave her] the chance to bring readers in slowly, via as many strands as [she could]."

With Fugitive Pieces, Michaels lays the thematic foundation of her future works, exploring the relationship between history and memory, and how we, as a people, remember. She also launches her meditation on "what love makes us capable of, and  incapable of," and the paradoxical understanding that "there is nothing a man will not do to another; nothing a man will not do for another." Confronting the horrors of war, violence, dislocation, and loss through her writing, Michaels "travels with the reader through terrain that is philosophically, morally and emotionally perilous" and refuses to publish unless she can "in some way deliver the reader and [herself] to the other side." She writes: "We don't need repeated proof of violence or horror - a single incident convinces us - but we do need proof, again and again, of the strength, the power, the reach, and the consequences of love."

Fugitive Pieces, the story of a holocaust survivor trying to find his way back into the world, went on to be critically acclaimed internationally, winning the Orange Prize for Fiction, the Guardian Fiction Prize, the Lannan Literary Award for Fiction, the Trillium Book Award, the Books in Canada First Novel Award, the City of Toronto Book Award, the Heritage Toronto Award of Merit, the Martin and Beatrice Fischer Award, the Harold Ribalow Award, the Giuseppe Acerbi Literary Award and the Jewish Quarterly-Wingate Prize.

While working on her second novel, The Winter Vault, Michaels released Skin Divers, her third poetry collection and the last of three volumes, beginning with The Weight of Oranges and Miner's Pond. All three were intended to speak to one another, and were later published in Poems (2000). Notable for her poetic style, both in her poetry and prose, Michaels writes that "[poetry is] such a good discipline for a novelist: it makes you aware that even if you have four or five hundred pages to play with, you mustn't waste a single word."

During this period, Michaels also began writing for the stage. A collaboration with John Berger led to the development of Vanishing Points (2005), a profound meditation on railways, love and loss, directed by Simon McBurney, produced by Complicite and presented in the historic German Gymnasium in King's Cross. This work was later published as Railtracks (2011). She also contributed the libretto to Canadian composer Omar Daniel's The Passion of Lavinia Andronicus (2005), offering a new dimension to the tragic figure at the centre of one of Shakespeare's most harrowing plays in a performance by the Hilliard Ensemble and Tafelmusik Chamber Choir.

Michaels would not publish The Winter Vault until 2009, thirteen years following the release of Fugitive Pieces which, likewise, took nearly a decade to write. Like Fugitive Pieces, her second novel considers deeply the "complicated relationship between huge historic events and intimate, domestic events; the relationship between historical grief and personal grief; how we remember privately, and how we remember - and memorialize – publicly, collectively. Each community, each nation, faces this question and answers it in its own way, according to its own needs."

Connecting three historic events - the dismantling and reconstruction of Egypt's Abu Simbel Temple; the building of the St. Lawrence Seaway in Canada and the drowning of towns, villages and graves; and the rebuilding of Warsaw after World War II - the novel considers whether a temple, taken apart stone by stone and rebuilt, is the same temple; a river barraged, the same river; a city reconstructed, the same city; and whether the heart can be repaired and rebuilt after a profound personal loss. The Winter Vault went on to garner international praise and was a finalist for the Scotiabank Giller Prize, the Trillium Book Award and the Commonwealth Prize, and was also long-listed for the International Dublin Literary Award.

In 2011, Michaels contributed to the Bush Theatre's 24-hour performance of Sixty-Six Books to mark the 400th anniversary of the King James Bible, providing 66 playwrights, poets, songwriters, and novelists - of all faiths and none, from over a dozen countries and across five continents - the opportunity to respond to some of the oldest stories ever told. Her contribution, "The Crossing," was later anthologized in Sixty-Six Books: 21st Century Writers Speak to the King James Bible (2011). An extract from "The Crossing" was also performed at Westminster Abbey's King James Bible Service for Her Majesty The Queen, His Royal Highness The Duke of Edinburgh and His Royal Highness The Prince of Wales.

Michaels returned to poetry with the release of her book-length poem, Correspondences (2013), an historic and personal elegy in an accordion-style format that can be read frontwards or backwards. A collaboration with artist Bernice Eisenstein, Correspondences alternates poetry with haunting portraits of the 20th century writers and thinkers to whom Michaels' pays tribute. The work went on to receive the Helen and Stan Vine Book Award and was shortlisted for the Griffin Poetry Prize.

In October 2015, Michaels began her tenure as the poet laureate of Toronto, succeeding George Elliott Clarke. Her personal mandate is to provide a platform for Toronto's many tongues: "How do we make a space for all these literatures that have come to us in such tremendous largesse, such tremendous richness? We need Torontonians to bring their cultures, bring their poets to us, so we have access to that huge international library." 2015 also saw the release of Michaels' first children's book, The Adventures of Miss Petitfour, with its follow-up, The Further Adventures of Miss Petitfour, being released in 2022.

In 2017 a new collection of poetry, All We Saw, and a new work of non-fiction, Infinite Gradation (with afterword by poet Gareth Evans) were published. Both books were shortlisted for the 2019 Vine Awards for Canadian Jewish Literature in the Poetry and Non-Fiction categories respectively. Infinite Gradation won the Non-Fiction prize.

Publications

Poetry collections

Novels

Other selected works
 The Passion of Lavinia Andronicus (2005)
 Vanishing Points (2005)
 Sixty-Six Books (2011)
 Sea of Lanterns (2012)
 The Adventures of Miss Petitfour (2015)
 Infinite Gradation (2017)
 The Further Adventures of Miss Petitfour (2022)

Adaptations 
Fugitive Pieces was directed and adapted for the screen by Jeremy Podeswa, scored by Nikos Kypourgos, and selected to open the 2007 Toronto International Film Festival. Michaels' debut novel was also adapted into a radio drama for BBC Radio 3.

Skin Divers was adapted in 2009 for the National Ballet of Canada by Dominique Dumais with music by Gavin Bryars. Incorporating spoken word and visual projections, Skin Divers explores "the body as a living archive of experience, or a museum of memory."

References

External links
 Anne Michaels's entry in The Canadian Encyclopedia
 Profile at the University of Toronto
 Canadian Authors website
 The poem "Phantom Limbs" from The Weight of Oranges/Miner's Pond

1958 births
Living people
Canadian women poets
University of Toronto alumni
Canadian women novelists
Academic staff of the University of Toronto
Jewish Canadian writers
Poets Laureate of Toronto
20th-century Canadian novelists
20th-century Canadian poets
21st-century Canadian novelists
20th-century Canadian women writers
21st-century Canadian women writers
Amazon.ca First Novel Award winners